N-Methylornithine is an amino acid with the formula CH3N(H)(CH2)3CH(NH2)CO2H.  It is a white solid. It occurs naturally, albeit rarely.

References

Basic amino acids
Amino acid derivatives
Diamines